Mito Fabie (born 1993), known professionally as Curtismith, is a Filipino indie singer, rapper and songwriter. He is best known for his debut mixtape Ideal in 2015, and his EPs Failing Forward (released in 2016) and Soully Yours (released in 2017). He released his debut album Museo in 2021.

He was featured on various music festivals and other events, including Wanderland Music and Arts Festival in 2016. He was also featured on Kiana Valenciano's hit single "Does She Know." In 2017, he was included in a collaboration project by Coca-Cola called Coke Studio PH with Noel Cabangon.

Discography

Studio albums
Museo (2021)

EPs
 Failing Forward (2016)
 Soully Yours (2017)
Dining Table (2019)

Mixtapes
Ideal (2015)

Singles
"LDR"
"Splash"

As a featured artist
"Does She Know" (song by Kiana Valenciano)
"This Is Our Life Now"  (song by Sleep Talker)

References

21st-century Filipino male singers
Filipino singer-songwriters
Living people
1994 births
Singers from Metro Manila